The 2021 NAIA men's basketball tournament was held March 12-23 at Municipal Auditorium in Kansas City, Missouri. The 83rd annual NAIA basketball tournament featured 48 teams playing in a single-elimination format. The opening game round was played on March 12 and 13, producing 16 teams which got reseeded for the championship round.  The National Championship Game was played on March 23.

Awards and honors
Frank Cramer Award: David Block, Block & Co.
Dr. James Naismith-Emil S. Liston Sportsmanship Award: Loyola (La.)
2021 All-Tournament Team: TreVion Crews, Bethel (Ind.); Mason Walters, Jamestown (N.D.); Damek Mitchell, Lewis-Clark State (Idaho); Trystan Bradley, Lewis-Clark State (Idaho); Hodges Bailey, Lewis-Clark State (Idaho); Zach Wrightsil, Loyola (La.); Joel Polius, SAGU (Texas); Antwaan Cushingberry, Saint Francis (Ind.); James Jones, Shawnee State (Ohio); EJ Onu, Shawnee State (Ohio)

2021 NAIA bracket

Opening round

Alexandria bracket

Crestview Hills bracket

Lewiston bracket

Marion bracket

Montgomery bracket

Omaha bracket

Park City bracket

Wichita bracket

Championship bracket

References

NAIA Men's Basketball Championship
Tournament
NAIA men's basketball tournament
NAIA men's basketball tournament
College basketball tournaments in Missouri
Basketball competitions in Kansas City, Missouri